"A Piece of the Action" is the seventeenth episode of the second season of the American science fiction television series Star Trek. Written by David P. Harmon and Gene L. Coon, and directed by James Komack, it was first broadcast on January 12, 1968.

The Enterprise visits a planet with an Earth-like 1920s gangster culture, with Runyonesque dialog and costumes.

This was the last Star Trek script credited to Gene L. Coon. Its repeat on August 30, 1968, was the last episode to air in the 8:30 pm time slot on Friday nights on NBC.

Plot
The Federation starship  USS Enterprise has been ordered to Sigma Iotia II, where the space vessel Horizon was reported missing 100 years earlier. The ship receives a message from Bela Okmyx, an Iotian, who promises information about the Horizon and invites the crew down to the planet. First Officer Spock notes that their interference in the planet's development could violate the Prime Directive, but Captain Kirk points out that the Horizons arrival a century ago would have already contaminated the culture. Kirk, Spock, and Chief Medical Officer Dr. McCoy transport to the planet.

They find themselves in a city fashioned after an American city of the 1920s, and some of the residents appear to be gangsters carrying Tommy guns. Okmyx's men escort the landing party to his offices; en route, they observe a drive-by shooting that kills one of their escorts, but the other continues on as if nothing had happened. They arrive at Okmyx's office, where Okmyx orders his men to make a retaliatory attack against a rival gang led by Jojo Krako. Spock discovers an Earth book, Chicago Mobs of the Twenties, published in 1992, and determines it was left by the crew of the Horizon. The Iotians have modelled their entire society on "The Book", which they regard with near-religious reverence. Okmyx demands the Enterprise crew supply his gang with "heaters" (phasers), and when Kirk refuses, threatens to kill them. The landing party is held while Okmyx uses a communicator to repeat the demand to Chief Engineer Scott.

Kirk distracts their guards by intruding on their poker game and teaching them the fictitious game of "fizzbin", allowing Spock and McCoy to overpower them. McCoy and Spock flee to a radio station to contact the Enterprise and transport back to the ship, while Krako's men capture Kirk.

Krako demands phasers of Kirk as well, offering to cut him in for a third of "the action" in exchange. Kirk offers a peaceful solution, but Krako refuses and confines him, threatening to kill him by slow torture if he doesn't cooperate. Okmyx contacts the ship, informs them of Kirk's capture, and offers to help rescue Kirk if they will help him. Spock and McCoy return to the planet, but are quickly captured by Okmyx. However, Kirk has managed to engineer his own escape, and arrives in Okmyx's office in time to rescue Spock and McCoy.

The three set a plan in motion. Taking suits and hats from Okmyx's men, Kirk and Spock return to Krako's office and gain entrance with the help of a local teenager. Quickly subduing Krako's men, Kirk informs Krako that the Federation is taking over the entire planet, but if Krako helps to maintain order and be a willing agent of the Federation, they will give him a "piece of the action". Krako agrees, but for safekeeping, Kirk transports him to the Enterprise. They then make the same offer to Okmyx, which he quickly accepts. As they prepare for the meeting of all of the planet's bosses, Krako's men attack Okmyx's headquarters, but the Enterprise uses the ship's phasers to stun the men as they approach. Both Okmyx and Krako realize that they are at Kirk's mercy, and agree to work for the Federation. Kirk installs Okmyx as the top boss with Krako as his lieutenant, and states that a Federation ship will come by once a year for their 40% cut of the planet's "action".

Kirk, Spock, and McCoy transport back to the Enterprise where Kirk proposes that the Federation's "cut" be used in a planetary fund to guide the Iotians into a more ethical society. McCoy reveals that he left his communicator on the planet. Kirk and Spock note that the Iotians will analyse the technology. Kirk amusedly states that the Iotians may one day be in a position to demand "a piece of our action!"

Reception
 In 2009, Zack Handlen of The A.V. Club gave the episode a "B+" rating, noting that it was a "very silly hour of Trek, and it's a wonderfully entertaining one". 
 In 2013, Wired magazine ranked this episode one of the top ten episodes of the original television series.
 In 2015, Polygon ranked "A Piece of the Action" as one of the three best Spock-centric episodes of Star Trek. They praised actor Leonard Nimoy for his portrayal of Spock with "dry, calculated wit."
 In 2016, The Hollywood Reporter rated "A Piece of the Action" the 12th best television episode of all Star Trek franchise television shows prior to Star Trek: Discovery, including live-action and animated series but not counting the movies.
 In 2018, Collider ranked this episode the 18th best original series episode.
 A 2018 Star Trek binge-watching guide by Den of Geek recommended this episode as one of the best of the original series.
 In 2019, the episode was noted as the 8th funniest episode of the Star Trek franchise, by CBR.
 In 2020, Deadline Hollywood and IndieWire cited "A Piece of the Action" as the episode who influenced Quentin Tarantino's pitch for an unproduced Star Trek film developed as a potential Star Trek reboot that would serve as a film prequel to Star Trek: The Original Series.
 In 2021, Den of Geek ranked this the fifth best episode of the original series, noting how it demonstrated the range of genres Star Trek can enter, as well as praising its comedic elements.

References

External links

"Mission Into Chaos" First draft of "A Piece of the Action" September 28, 1967; report & analysis by Dave Eversole

Star Trek: The Original Series (season 2) episodes
1968 American television episodes
Television episodes written by Gene L. Coon
Television episodes written by David P. Harmon